Theodor Caspari (13 February 1853 – 12 February 1948) was a Norwegian poet, novelist, travel writer, literary critic and teacher.

He was the son of Carl Paul Caspari. He made his literary début in 1880 with the poetry collection Polemiske Sonetter. Among his other works are Norsk Høifjeld from 1898 and Vintereventyr from 1901.

References

1853 births
1948 deaths
Writers from Oslo
19th-century Norwegian poets
Norwegian male poets
19th-century Norwegian novelists
20th-century Norwegian novelists
Norwegian literary critics
Norwegian male novelists
19th-century Norwegian male writers
20th-century Norwegian male writers